Judy is an unincorporated community located in Montgomery County, Kentucky, United States. It is most noted for having one of the few remaining operating drive-in theaters in the state. Wesley Crouch was re-elected mayor in 2022.

The community is part of the Mount Sterling Micropolitan Statistical Area.

Climate
Climate is characterized by relatively high temperatures and evenly distributed precipitation throughout the year.  The Köppen Climate Classification subtype for this climate is "Cfa". (Humid Subtropical Climate).

References

Unincorporated communities in Montgomery County, Kentucky
Unincorporated communities in Kentucky
Mount Sterling, Kentucky micropolitan area